Beach Bros is a Philippine youth-oriented comedy drama streaming television miniseries directed by Victor Kaiba Villanueva, which premiered from July 16 to 31, 2022 on iWantTFC.

Premise
Best friends Dave, Billy, Jason, Pete, and Jeremy all enjoyed living life to the fullest in the tropical beaches of Baler, Aurora. Dave, who aspires to get educated in Manila, must continue to face the hard times as his mother struggles to make a living and help Dave fulfill his dream, until he would suddenly meet a tourist named Nicole due to an accident. Not knowingly, there is something suspicious with Nicole's stay in Baler that would test both Dave's restrained feelings for her, and the friendship the "Baler Boys" having sustained just for that reason.

Cast and characters

Main cast
Baler Boys
Kyle Echarri as Dave Alon, the mischievous leader of the gang aspiring to get educated in Manila
Lance Justin Carr as Billy Alon, the jester of the gang
Brent Manalo as Jason Coral, a gregarious partygoing friend from Manila
Raven Rigor as Pete Resureccion, a racketeering waiter who is a pastor's child
Sean Tristan as Jeremy Marvista, an aspiring vlogger with 30 subscribers

Girls around the Boys
Chie Filomeno as Nicole Solana, a sexy tourist from Manila who has a mission to fulfill in Baler
Kira Balinger as Erika Aguador, a school valedictorian and the only child of a local politician
Angelica Lao as Yasmin Viaje, a perky tour guide aspiring to get educated in Manila

Supporting cast
Malou de Guzman as Chona, Dave and Paulo's mother
Ian de Leon as Vladimir, leader of the Black Snakes syndicate
Jason Gainza as Pete's pastor-father
JC Santos as Paulo, Dave's late older brother and Nicole's late boyfriend
Jeffrey Santos as Konsi Michael, a local politician in Baler
Adrian Lindayag as Candy, Billy's gay sibling managing the Beach Bros Bar
Ryan Rems as Greg, Billy's weird-acting brother working at the Beach Bros Bar
Yesh Burce as Stacy, Vladimir's accomplice who is tasked to follow Nicole's activities in Baler

Production

Casting
As reported by the Philippine Star, this is Echarri's first leading role in a series as he had been paired with Francine Diaz in some of ABS-CBN's drama projects and with The Gold Squad previously. This is also the first series for Echarri and Filomeno as a pair, where the two were part of the Celebrity Edition of Pinoy Big Brother: Kumunity Season 10 in 2021.

Marketing
A teaser was released on June 21, 2022, while the full trailer was released on June 28, 2022 via iWantTFC's social media channels with its release date scheduled on July 16, 2022. On July 3, 2022, Echarri and Filomeno led the casts in gracing the ASAP Natin 'To stage with Rigor, Manalo, Carr, and Lao as part of the Beach Bros promotion.

Release
New episodes were released Saturdays and Sundays.

Broadcast
The series premiered on July 16 to July 31, 2022, on iWantTFC.

The series had its TV Premiere from March 18, 2023 on the Yes Weekend primetime block on Kapamilya Channel, Kapamilya Online Live and A2Z replacing The Goodbye Girl.

References

ABS-CBN drama series
IWantTFC original programming
2022 web series debuts
2022 Philippine television series debuts
2022 web series endings

External links
 
 Beach Bros on iWantTFC